The power of arrest is a mandate given by a central authority that allows an individual to remove a criminal's (or suspected criminal's) liberty. The power of arrest can also be used to protect a person, or persons from harm or to protect damage to property.

However, in many countries, a person also has powers of arrest under citizen's arrest or any person arrest / breach of the peace arrest powers.

Individuals with powers of arrest
Originally, powers of arrest were confined to sheriffs in England for a local area. Over the past few hundred years, the legal power of arrest has gradually expanded to include a large number of people/officials, the majority of which have come to the fore more recently. These various individuals all may utilise similar or different powers of arrest, but generally adhere to one particular field.

The individuals below have been listed in order of when the power of arrest became available to the individual, starting from the earliest.

United Kingdom

England & Wales
The following individuals all have various powers of arrest or detention within England & Wales in various capacities using the following legislation/law:

Police Constables
Common law - to prevent a Breach of the Peace
Section 49 of the Prison Act 1952
Section 32 Children & Young Persons Act 1969
Immigration Act 1971
Section 7 of the Bail Act 1976
Section 1 & Section 13 of the Magistrates' Courts Act 1980 (warrants)
Section 136 of the Mental Health Act 1983
Section 24 Police Criminal Evidence Act 1984
Section 46A Police Criminal Evidence Act 1984
Section 31 Police Criminal Evidence Act 1984
Section 6D of the Road Traffic Act 1988
Section 41 of the Terrorism Act 2000
Section 9 of the Anti-social Behaviour, Crime and Policing Act 2014

National Crime Agency (formerly SOCA) officer
(N.B. can possess powers of immigration, customs and excise and Police constable simultaneously)
s46 Serious Organised Crime and Police Act 2005

Police Community Support Officers (PCSOs)
Common law - to prevent a Breach of the Peace
s24A Police Criminal Evidence Act 1984
Power to detain under Police Reform Act 2002

Members of public ("Other persons" i.e. anyone who is not a constable)
Common law - to prevent a Breach of the Peace
s.24A Police and Criminal Evidence Act 1984 - for criminal offences not limited to summary trial alone

Immigration Officer (formerly UK Border Agency)
s28a Immigration Act 1971
schedule 2, paragraph 17(1) Immigration Act 1971
s23 UK Borders Act 2007

HMRC Criminal Investigation Officers

Service Police (RMP/RAFP/RNP)
s67/69 Armed Forces Act 2006

Prison officers

Church Warden 
s3 Ecclesiastical Courts Jurisdiction Act 1860

HMP Prison Officer

Court bailiff

Court officer

Court security officer
s53 Courts Act 2003 (power to restrain and remove) 

Sheriff (Sheriffs Act 1887)

Serjeant at Arms of the House of Commons

"Officer or agent"
s156 Companies Clauses Consolidation Act 1845 
Part 4 - Chapter 19 - Rule 4.2111 Insolvency Rules 1986

Epping Forest Keepers (park rangers)

Environment Agency officer

Water bailiff

IPCC investigators
Police Reform Act 2002

United States

In the United States, various law enforcement officers are able to legally arrest people. Due to the complexity of the American civil legal system, including the interactions between federal, state, county, and local jurisdictions, there are numerous special cases that apply, depending on the reason for the arrest.

References

See also

 Citizen's arrest
 Breach of the peace
 Powers of the police in England and Wales
 Powers of the police in Scotland

Criminal law
Law enforcement